Searcy House may refer to:

George A. Searcy House, listed on the National Register of Historic Places in Tuscaloosa County, Alabama
Dr. James T. Searcy House, listed on the National Register of Historic Places in Tuscaloosa County, Alabama